The Men's Team racquetball competition at the 2019 Pan American Games in Lima, Peru was held between August 7th and 10th, 2019 at the Racquetball courts located at the Villa Deportiva Regional del Callao cluster. Bolivia won the Men’s Team event for the first time in Pan American Games history, as Mexico had won the two previous Men's Team events in Racquetball at the Pan American Games.

Schedule

All times are Central Standard Time (UTC-6).

Playoffs

Final standings

References

External links
Results book

Racquetball at the 2019 Pan American Games